The Washington Nationals' 2005 season was the first for the team formerly known as the Montreal Expos since moving to Washington, D. C. and 37th overall for the franchise.  The team signed four key free agents during the off-season: Vinny Castilla, José Guillén, Cristian Guzmán and Esteban Loaiza. Although they recorded an 81–81 record, the Nationals nevertheless finished last for a second consecutive year although they were only nine games behind the NL East champion Atlanta Braves.

Offseason
On November 9, 2004, the Nationals traded Maicer Izturis and Juan Rivera to the Los Angeles Angels of Anaheim for José Guillén. 
On November 24, 2004, the Nationals traded minor leaguer Antonio Sucre to the Pittsburgh Pirates for J. J. Davis. 
On January 19, 2005, they signed Esteban Loaiza as a free agent. 
On February 8, 2005, they agreed to terms with Mike Shuster via a walk on. 
On February 9, 2005, they signed Melvin Nieves, also as a free agent. 
On February 13, 2005, the Nationals traded minor leaguer Jerry Owens to the Chicago White Sox for Alex Escobar. 
On February 15, 2005, they traded Alejandro Machado to the Boston Red Sox for a player to be named later; the Red Sox sent minor-leaguer Carlos Torres to the Nationals on March 28, 2005, to complete the trade.  
On March 22, 2005, the Nationals traded minor leaguer A. J. Wideman to the Toronto Blue Jays for Tyrell Godwin 
On March 24, 2005, they traded Seth Greisinger to the Atlanta Braves as part of a conditional deal.

Spring training
The Nationals held their 2005 spring training in Viera, Florida, with home games played at Space Coast Stadium.

Advertising and marketing
The Nationals' marketing slogan for the season was "Let Yourself Go." Nationals Vice President of Sales and Marketing David Cope explained that the slogan told "people to come to the game, to let themselves come out here [to Robert F. Kennedy Memorial Stadium]. But then once you're here, have fun, let loose. We don't want it to feel like stuffy old D.C. -- and it doesn't."

Mascot

Screech, the mascot of the Washington Nationals, made his debut near the beginning of the 2005 season. A bald eagle who wears the home cap and jersey of the team, he was "hatched" on April 17, 2005, at the "Kids Opening Day" promotion at Robert F. Kennedy Memorial Stadium during the third home game in Nationals history, a game against the Arizona Diamondbacks. A nine-year-old fourth-grade student in Washington, Glenda Gutierrez, designed the mascot and won a contest sponsored by the team, explaining that Screech was "strong and eats almost everything." The first, chubby version of Screech appeared during the team's first four seasons in Washington; just before the start of the 2009 season, the Nationals replaced him with a thin version who debuted in March 2009, explaining that Screech had "grown up" and become a "teenager."

Broadcast media difficulties
The Nationals' broadcasting deal for 2005 was put together at the last minute and led to difficulties for fans attempting to follow the team on radio or television. Its two flagship radio stations – FM-104.1 WWZZ in Waldorf, Maryland, and AM-1050 WFED in Silver Spring, Maryland – had weak signals and were not audible in many of Washington's suburbs. On television, the Nationals′ network, the new Mid-Atlantic Sports Network (MASN), was carried on DirecTv, RCN Cable, and Verizon′s fiberoptic service and WTTG Channel 5 and WDCA Channel 20 broadcast 79 games, but the Washington area's dominant cable television provider, Comcast, refused to carry MASN during the season because of an ongoing legal battle with MASN over broadcast rights to Baltimore Orioles games. The limitation of radio and television coverage forced may Nationals fans to rely on print media and in-person attendance at games to follow the team during 2005.

Regular season

The Nationals had a terrific first half, as they had a 51–32 record by July 5 and were leading the Atlanta Braves by 4.5 games. However, the team struggled in its final 79 games, going 30-49 and scoring only 299 runs (3.78 per game). They were also shut out 7 times during that span. Nevertheless, the teams was able to finish the season at .500; this was only the fourth time in 10 years that the franchise had finished at or above .500.

Highlights
The Washington Nationals first regular season game was on April 4, 2005 against the Philadelphia Phillies at Citizens Bank Park in Philadelphia. The Nationals' Brad Wilkerson, the last player to ever wear a Montreal Expo jersey for the Expos, had the honor of being the first batter for the Washington Nationals and he promptly responded with the first hit in the new team's history. But Kenny Lofton hit a three-run homer and Jon Lieber pitched 5 effective innings, leading the Phillies to an 8–4 victory over the new Nationals at Citizens Bank Park.  (Lieber was credited with the win for the Phillies and would also score a win for Philadelphia in the last game of the 2005 Nationals season.)  Outfielder Terrmel Sledge hit the Nats' first home run in the April 4 contest.
 Scorecard: April 4, Citizens Bank Park, Philadelphia

On April 6, 2005, the Washington Nationals recorded their first-ever regular season win by beating the Phillies, 7–3. The win came in their second game of the season and was highlighted by Wilkerson's hit for the cycle.
On April 14, 2005, the Washington Nationals won their first regular season home game at RFK Stadium in Washington, D.C., by a score of 5–3 against the Arizona Diamondbacks.  President George W. Bush kept up a tradition of sitting U.S. Presidents by throwing out the ceremonial first pitch on opening day in Washington, exactly 95 years after William Howard Taft started the tradition at Griffith Stadium in 1910.  There were 45,596 fans in attendance, including former Senators players and Baseball Commissioner Bud Selig. Liván Hernández threw eight shutout innings, and Vinny Castilla was denied the chance to hit for the cycle when Diamondback reliever Lance Cormier hit him with a pitch in the bottom of the eighth; Castilla needed only a single to complete the cycle. Chad Cordero recorded the save for Washington.
On August 4, 2005, Brad Wilkerson became the first Washington Nationals player to ever hit a grand slam, against then Los Angeles Dodgers relief pitcher, Duaner Sánchez. The Nationals won the game 7–0, on a four-hit complete-game shutout by John Patterson.
During his August–September callup, Ryan Zimmerman recorded 23 hits in 58 at bats.  He thus became the first member of the Washington Nationals to complete the season with a batting average of at least .300 in at least 50 at bats.
The Nationals led all National League teams in interleague play in 2005, recording 12 wins.

Season standings

National League East

Record vs. opponents

Opening Day lineup

Notable transactions

May 14, 2005: The Nationals traded Endy Chávez to the Philadelphia Phillies for Marlon Byrd.
May 31, 2005: The Nationals released Melvin Nieves.
June 10, 2005: The Nationals traded Tomo Ohka to the Milwaukee Brewers for Junior Spivey.
July 13, 2005: The Nationals signed Mike Stanton as a free agent and traded J. J. Davis, Zach Day, and cash to the Colorado Rockies for Preston Wilson.
July 20, 2005: The Nationals selected Kenny Kely off waivers from the Cincinnati Reds.
August 6, 2005: The Nationals sent Steve Randolph to the San Francisco Giants as part of a conditional deal.
August 30, 2005: The Nationals traded minor leaguer Ben Cox to the San Francisco Giants for Deivi Cruz.
September 29, 2005: The Nationals traded Mike Stanton to the Boston Red Sox for minor-leaguers Rhys Taylor and Yader Peralta.

Draft
The 2005 Major League Baseball First-Year Player Draft took place on June 7 and 8. With their first pick – the fourth pick overall – the Nationals selected third baseman Ryan Zimmerman, who would advance through the minor leagues quickly and join the Nationals in September. Other notable players the Nationals selected were outfielder Justin Maxwell (fourth round, 114th overall), pitcher Marco Estrada (sixth round, 174th overall), pitcher John Lannan (11th round, 324th overall), pitcher Craig Stammen (12th round, 354th overall), pitcher Ryan Buchter (33rd round, 984th overall), first baseman Tyler Moore (41st round, 1,222nd overall), and pitcher Scott Barnes (43rd round, 1,280th overall). Moore and Barnes did not sign with the team.

Roster

Attendance
The Nationals drew 2,731,993 fans at Robert F. Kennedy Memorial Stadium in 2005, placing them eighth in attendance for the season among the 16 National League teams.

Game log

|-  style="text-align:center; background:#fbb;"
| 1 || April 4 || @ Philadelphia Phillies || 4-8 || Lieber (1-0) || Hernández (0-1) || || 44,080 || 0-1
|-  style="text-align:center; background:#bfb;"
| 2 || April 6 || @ Philadelphia Phillies || 7-3 || Eischen (1-0) || Worrell (0-1)|| || 23,435 || 1-1
|-  style="text-align:center; background:#bfb;"
| 3 || April 7 || @ Philadelphia Phillies || 5-4 (10)||Cordero (1-0) || Cormier (0-1) || || 21,693 || 2-1
|-  style="text-align:center; background:#fbb;"
| 4 || April 8 || @ Florida Marlins || 0-9 || Willis (1-0) || Ohka (0-1) || || 19,327 || 2-2
|-  style="text-align:center; background:#bfb;"
| 5 || April 9 || @ Florida Marlins || 3-2 (10) || Cordero (2-0) || Alfonseca (0-1) || || 30,739 || 3-2
|-  style="text-align:center; background:#fbb;"
| 6 || April 10 || @ Florida Marlins || 0-8 || Beckett (2-0) || Patterson (0-1) || || 25,089 || 3-3
|-  style="text-align:center; background:#fbb;"
| 7 ||April 11 || @ Atlanta Braves || 2-11 || Hampton (1-0) || Day (0-1) || || 16,584 || 3-4 
|-  style="text-align:center; background:#bfb;"
| 8 ||April 12 || @ Atlanta Braves || 4-3 || Ayala (1-0) || Kolb (0-1) || Cordero (1) || 20,122 || 4-4
|-  style="text-align:center; background:#bfb;"
| 9 ||April 13 || @ Atlanta Braves || 11-4 || Ohka (1-1) || Thomson (1-1) || || 19,093 || 5-4
|-  style="text-align:center; background:#bfb;"
| 10 || April 14 || Arizona Diamondbacks || 5-3 || Hernández (1-1) || Vázquez (0-2) || Cordero (2) || 45,596 || 6-4
|-  style="text-align:center; background:#bfb;"
| 11 || April 16 || Arizona Diamondbacks || 9-3 || Patterson (1-1) || Ortiz (1-1) || || 34,943 || 7-4
|-  style="text-align:center; background:#bfb;"
| 12 || April 17 || Arizona Diamondbacks || 7-3 || Tucker (1-0) || Koplove (1-1) || || 35,463 ||8-4
|-  style="text-align:center; background:#fbb;"
| 13 || April 18 || Florida Marlins || 4-9 || Willis (3-0) || Ohka (1-2) || || 24,003 || 8-5
|-  style="text-align:center; background:#fbb;"
| 14 || April 19 || Florida Marlins || 3-6 || Moehler (1-0) || Hernández (1-2) || || 25,990 || 8-6
|-  style="text-align:center; background:#bfb;"
| 15 || April 20 || Atlanta Braves || 2-0 || Day (1-1) || Ramírez (1-1) || Cordero (3) || 27,374 || 9-6
|-  style="text-align:center; background:#fbb;"
| 16 || April 21 || Atlanta Braves || 1-2 || Reitsma (1-0) || Cordero (2-1) || Kolb (5) || 30,728 || 9-7
|-  style="text-align:center; background:#fbb;"
| 17 || April 22 || @ New York Mets || 1-3 || Glavine (1-2) || Loaiza (0-1) || Looper (2) || 28,488 || 9-8
|-  style="text-align:center; background:#fbb;"
| 18 || April 23 || @ New York Mets || 5-10 || Seo (1-0) || Ohka (1-3) || || 44,058 || 9-9
|-  style="text-align:center; background:#bfb;"
| 19 || April 24 || @ New York Mets || 11-4 || Hernández (2-2) || Zambrano (1-2) || || 43,313 || 10-9
|-  style="text-align:center; background:#fbb;"
| 20 || April 25 || Philadelphia Phillies || 4-5 || Lidle (1-2) || Day (1-2) ||Wagner (4) || 24,956 ||10-10
|-  style="text-align:center; background:#bfb;"
| 21 || April 26 || Philadelphia Phillies || 3-1 || Patterson (2-1) || Lieber(4-1) || Cordero (4) || 23,332 || 11-10
|-  style="text-align:center; background:#fbb;"
| 22 || April 27 || Philadelphia Phillies || 0-3 || Cormier (1-1) ||Loaiza (0-2) || Wagner (5) || 27,483 || 11-11
|-  style="text-align:center; background:#bfb;"
| 23 || April 29 || New York Mets || 5-1 || Hernández (3-2) || Seo (1-1) || Cordero (5) || 30,627 || 12-11
|-  style="text-align:center; background:#bfb;"
| 24 || April 30 || New York Mets || 5-3 || Ohka (2-3) || Zambrano (1-3) || Carrasco (1) || 40,913 || 13-11
|-

|-  style="text-align:center; background:#fbb;"
| 25 || May 1 || New York Mets || 3-6 || Hernández (2-0) || Ayala (1-1) || Looper (4) || 27,333 || 13-12
|-  style="text-align:center; background:#bfb;"
| 26 || May 2 || @ Los Angeles Dodgers || 6-2 || Loaiza (1-2) || Erickson (1-3) || || 34,079 || 14-12
|-  style="text-align:center; background:#fbb;"
| 27 || May 3 || @ Los Angeles Dodgers || 2-4 || Weaver (3-2) || Rauch (0-1) || Brazobán (9) || 41,190 || 14-13
|-  style="text-align:center; background:#bfb;"
| 28 || May 4 || @ Los Angeles Dodgers || 5-2 || Hernández (4-2) || Pérez (4-2) || || 33,081 || 15-13
|-  style="text-align:center; background:#bfb;"
| 29 || May 6 || @ San Francisco Giants || 9-3 || Rauch (1-1) || Lowry (1-3) || || 40,425 || 16-13
|-  style="text-align:center; background:#bfb;"
| 30 || May 7 || @ San Francisco Giants || 11-8 || Ayala (2-1) || Accardo (0-1) || Cordero (6) || 40,220 || 17-13
|-  style="text-align:center; background:#fbb;"
| 31 || May 8 || @ San Francisco Giants || 3-4 (13) || Christiansen (2-0) || Rauch (1-2) || || 36,903 || 17-14
|-  style="text-align:center; background:#bfb;"
| 32 || May 9 || @ Arizona Diamondbacks || 4-3 || Hernández (5-2) || Valverde (0-1) || Cordero (7) || 19,440 || 18-14
|-  style="text-align:center; background:#fbb;"
| 33 || May 10 || @ Arizona Diamondbacks || 2-3 || Estes (3-3) || Armas (0-1) || Lyon (12) || 23,181 || 18-15
|-  style="text-align:center; background:#fbb;"
| 34 || May 11 || @ Arizona Diamondbacks || 2-3 || Cormier (2-0) || Rauch (1-3) || Lyon (13) || 21,011 || 18-16
|-  style="text-align:center; background:#fbb;"
| 35 || May 13 || Chicago Cubs || 3-6 || Ohman (1-0) || Ayala (2-2) || Wellemeyer (1) || 36,585 || 18-17
|-  style="text-align:center; background:#bfb;"
| 36 || May 14 || Chicago Cubs || 4-3 || Hernández (6-2) || Zambrano (3-2) || Cordero (8) || 42,829 || 19-17
|-  style="text-align:center; background:#bfb;"
| 37 || May 15 || Chicago Cubs || 5-4 || Carrasco(1-0) || Bartosh (0-2) || Cordero (9) || 44,103 || 20-17
|-  style="text-align:center; background:#bfb;"
| 38 || May 16 || Milwaukee Brewers || 5-2 || Armas (1-1) || Davis (4-5) || Ayala (1) || 26,606 || 21-17
|-  style="text-align:center; background:#fbb;"
| 39 || May 17 || Milwaukee Brewers || 2-8 || Obermueller (1-0) || Vargas (0-1) || || 26,427 || 21-18
|-  style="text-align:center; background:#bfb;"
| 40 || May 18 || Milwaukee Brewers || 1-0 || Majewski (1-0) || Capuano (3-3) || || 29,216 || 22-18
|-  style="text-align:center; background:#bfb;"
| 41 || May 19 || Milwaukee Brewers || 3-2 || Hernández (7-2) || Santos (1-4) || Cordero (10) || 30,968 || 23-18
|-  style="text-align:center; background:#fbb;"
| 42 || May 20 || Toronto Blue Jays || 1-6 || Lilly (2-4) || Vargas (0-2) || Walker (1) || 17,465 || 23-19
|-  style="text-align:center; background:#fbb;"
| 43 || May 21 || Toronto Blue Jays || 0-7 || Halladay (7-2) || Armas (1-2) || || 24,518 || 23-20
|-  style="text-align:center; background:#bfb;"
| 44 || May 22 || Toronto Blue Jays || 9-2 || Ohka (3-3) || Towers (5-2) || || 28,408 || 24-20
|-  style="text-align:center; background:#fbb;"
| 45 || May 23 || @ Cincinnati Reds || 3-5 || Milton (3-5) || Loaiza (1-3) || Weathers (1) || 17,630 || 24-21
|-  style="text-align:center; background:#fbb;"
| 46 || May 24 || @ Cincinnati Reds || 3-4 (15) || Keisler (1-0) || Ayala (2-3) || || 36,539 || 24-22
|-  style="text-align:center; background:#fbb;"
| 47 || May 25 || @ Cincinnati Reds || 3-12 || Belisle (2-4) || Vargass (0-3) || || 20,497 || 24-23
|-  style="text-align:center; background:#fbb;"
| 48 || May 27 || @ St. Louis Cardinals || 3-6 || Morris (5-0) || Armas (1-3) || Isringhausen (13) || 47,383 || 24-24
|-  style="text-align:center; background:#fbb;"
| 49 || May 28 || @ St. Louis Cardinals || 1-3 || Suppan (4-5) || Loaiza (1-4) || Isringhausen (14) || 49,123 || 24-25
|-  style="text-align:center; background:#bfb;"
| 50 || May 29 || @ St. Louis Cardinals || 3-2 || Hernández (8-2) || Carpenter (7-3) || Cordero (11) || 47,012 || 25-25
|-  style="text-align:center; background:#bfb;"
| 51 || May 30 || Atlanta Braves || 3-2 || Ohka (4-3) || Davies (2-1) || Cordero (12) || 39,705 || 26-25
|-  style="text-align:center; background:#bfb;"
| 52 || May 31 || Atlanta Braves || 5-4 || Ayala (3-3) || Colón (0-2) || Cordero (13) || 29,512 || 27-25
|-

|-  style="text-align:center; background:#fbb;"
| 53 || June 1 || Atlanta Braves || 4-5 || Smoltz (4-2) || Carrasco (1-1) || Reitsma (2) || 28,280 || 27-26
|-  style="text-align:center; background:#bfb;"
| 54 || June 2 || Atlanta Braves || 8-6 || Carrasco (2-1) || Kolb (1-5) || Cordero (14) || 29,225 || 28-26
|-  style="text-align:center; background:#bfb;"
| 55 || June 3 || Florida Marlins || 3-2 (11) || Ayala (4-3) || Bump (0-3) || || 29,439 || 29-26
|-  style="text-align:center; background:#bfb;"
| 56 || June 4 || Florida Marlins || 7-3 || Kim (1-0) || Leiter (2-6) || || 33,198 || 30-26
|-  style="text-align:center; background:#bfb;"
| 57 || June 5 || Florida Marlins || 6-3 || Ayala (5-3) || Riedling (2-1) || Cordero (15) || 40,995 || 31-26
|-  style="text-align:center; background:#bfb;"
| 58 || June 7 || Oakland Athletics || 2-1 || Armas (2-3) || Zito (2-7) || Cordero (16) || 26,879 || 32-26
|-  style="text-align:center; background:#bfb;"
| 59 || June 8 || Oakland Athletics || 7-2 || Loaiza (2-4) || Glynn (0-2) || || 28,749 || 33-26
|-  style="text-align:center; background:#bfb;"
| 60 || June 9 || Oakland Athletics || 4-3 || Hernández (9-2) || Blanton (1-6) || Cordero (17) || 26,672 || 34-26
|-  style="text-align:center; background:#bfb;"
| 61 || June 10 || Seattle Mariners || 9-3 || Ayala (6-3) || Hasegawa (1-2) || || 28,707 || 35-26
|-  style="text-align:center; background:#bfb;"
| 62 || June 11 || Seattle Mariners || 2-1 || Patterson (3-1) || Putz (1-2) || Cordero (18) || 39,108 || 36-26
|-  style="text-align:center; background:#bfb;"
| 63 || June 12 || Seattle Mariners || 3-2 || Armas (3-3) || Franklin (2-8) || Cordero (19) || 37,170 || 37-26
|-  style="text-align:center; background:#fbb;"
| 64 || June 13 || @ Los Angeles Angels of Anaheim || 1-11 || Byrd (6-5) || Loaiza (2-5) || || 40,790 || 37-27
|-  style="text-align:center; background:#bfb;"
| 65 || June 14 || @ Los Angeles Angels of Anaheim || 6-3 || Majewski (2-0) || Shields (5-4) || Cordero (20) ||43,874 || 38-27
|-  style="text-align:center; background:#bfb;"
| 66 || June 15 || @ Los Angeles Angels of Anaheim || 1-0 || Drese (5-6) || Colón (8-4) || Cordero (21) || 43,505 || 39-27
|-  style="text-align:center; background:#fbb;"
| 67 || June 17 || @ Texas Rangers || 1-8 || Rogers (9-2) || Patterson (3-2) || || 33,653 || 39-28
|-  style="text-align:center; background:#fbb;"
| 68 || June 18 || @ Texas Rangers || 4-7 || Rodríguez (2-0) || Armas (3-4) || || 48,663 || 39-29
|-  style="text-align:center; background:#bfb;"
| 69 || June 19 || @ Texas Rangers || 8-2 || Hughes (1-0) || Wilson (0-1) || || 34,474 || 40-29
|-  style="text-align:center; background:#bfb;"
| 70 || June 20 || @ Pittsburgh Pirates || 7-4 || Hernández (10-2) || Redman (4-5) || Cordero (22) || 21,893 || 41-29
|-  style="text-align:center; background:#fbb;"
| 71 || June 21 || @ Pittsburgh Pirates || 4-11 || Pérez (6-5) || Drese (5-7) || || 26,006 || 41-30
|-  style="text-align:center; background:#bfb;"
| 72 || June 22 || @ Pittsburgh Pirates || 5-4 || Carrasco (3-1) || Gonzalez (0-3) || Cordero (23) || 24,064 || 42-30
|-  style="text-align:center; background:#bfb;"
| 73 || June 24 || Toronto Blue Jays || 3-0 || Loaiza (3-5) || Towers (5-7) || Cordero (24) || 36,689 || 43-30
|-  style="text-align:center; background:#bfb;"
| 74 || June 25 || Toronto Blue Jays || 5-2 || Hernández (11-2) || Lilly (5-8) || Cordero (25) || 39,881 || 44-30
|-  style="text-align:center; background:#fbb;"
| 75 || June 26 || Toronto Blue Jays || 5-9 || Speier (1-1) || Ayala (6-4) || Batista (14) || 33,557 || 44-31
|-  style="text-align:center; background:#bfb;"
| 76 || June 28 || Pittsburgh Pirates || 2-1 || Drese (6-7) || Fogg (4-4) || Cordero (26) || 35,828 || 45-31
|-  style="text-align:center; background:#bfb;"
| 77 || June 29 || Pittsburgh Pirates || 3-2 || Ayala (7-4) || Torres (2-3) || Cordero (27) || 31,213 || 46-31
|-  style="text-align:center; background:#bfb;"
| 78 || June 30 || Pittsburgh Pirates || 7-5 || Loaiza (4-5) || Wells (5-8) || Cordero (28) || 37,361 || 47-31
|-

|-  style="text-align:center; background:#bfb;"
| 79 || July 1 || @ Chicago Cubs || 4-3 || Hernández (12-2) || Prior (5-2) || Carrasco (2) || 38,973 || 48-31
|-  style="text-align:center; background:#bfb;"
| 80 || July 2 || @ Chicago Cubs || 4-2 || Armas (4-4) || Williams (1-3) || Cordero (29) || 40,488 || 49-31
|-  style="text-align:center; background:#bfb;"
| 81 || July 3 || @ Chicago Cubs || 5-4 (12) || Eischen (2-0) || Mitre (2-4) || || 40,006 || 50-31
|-  style="text-align:center; background:#fbb;"
| 82 || July 4 || New York Mets || 2-5 || Hernández (4-2) || Kim (1-1) || Looper (18) || 44,331 || 50-32
|-  style="text-align:center; background:#bfb;"
| 83 || July 5 || New York Mets || 3-2 || Loaiza (5-5) || Martínez (9-3) || Cordero (30) || 35,087 || 51-32
|-  style="text-align:center; background:#fbb;"
| 84 || July 6 || New York Mets || 3-5 || Glavine (6-7) || Hernández (12-3) || Looper (19) || 38,148 || 51-33
|-  style="text-align:center; background:#fbb;"
| 85 || July 7 || New York Mets || 2-3 (11) || Bell (1-3) || Ayala (7-5) || Looper (20) || 44,492 ||51-34
|-  style="text-align:center; background:#bfb;"
| 86 || July 8 || @ Philadelphia Phillies || 8-7 || Drese (7-7) || Tejeda (3-2) || Cordero (31) || 44,688 || 52-34
|-  style="text-align:center; background:#fbb;"
| 87 || July 9 || @ Philadelphia Phillies || 0-1 || Wagner (2-1) || Carrasco (3-2) || || 33,365 || 52-35
|-  style="text-align:center; background:#fbb;"
| 88 || July 10 || @ Philadelphia Phillies || 4-5 (12) || Cormier (3-2) || Kim (1-2) || ||34,124 || 52-36
|- style="text-align:center; background:#bbb;"
|colspan=9| All–Star Break (July 11–13)
|-  style="text-align:center; background:#fbb;"
| 89 || July 14 || @ Milwaukee Brewers || 2-4 || Wise (3-2) || Majewski (2-1) || Turnbow (18) || 30,611 || 52-37
|-  style="text-align:center; background:#fbb;"
| 90 || July 15 || @ Milwaukee Brewers || 3-4 (10)  || Santana (2-3) || Ayala (7-6) || || 40,690 || 52-38
|-  style="text-align:center; background:#bfb;"
| 91 || July 16 || @ Milwaukee Brewers || 5-3 || Loaiza (6-5) || Bottalico (2-2) || Cordero (32) || 45,079 || 53-38
|-  style="text-align:center; background:#fbb;"
| 92 || July 17 || @ Milwaukee Brewers || 3-5 || Ohka (6-4) || Drese (7-8) || Turnbow (19) || 23,543 || 53-39
|-  style="text-align:center; background:#fbb;"
| 93 || July 18 || Colorado Rockies || 4-5 || Acevedo (1-0) || Cordero (2-2) || Fuentes (13) || 30,165 || 53-40
|-  style="text-align:center; background:#bfb;"
| 94 || July 19 || Colorado Rockies || 4-0 || Patterson (4-2) || Chacón (1-6) || Cordero (33) || 30,655 || 54-40
|-  style="text-align:center; background:#fbb;"
| 95 || July 20 || Colorado Rockies || 2-3 || Jennings (6-9) || Hernández (12-4) || Fuentes (14) || 32,381 || 54-41
|-  style="text-align:center; background:#fbb;"
| 96 || July 21 || Houston Astros || 2-3 || Oswalt (13-8) || Loaiza (6-6) || Lidge (22) || 36,840 || 54-42
|-  style="text-align:center; background:#fbb;"
| 97 || July 22 || Houston Astros || 1-14 || Clemens (8-4) || Drese (7-9) || || 38,019 || 54-43
|-  style="text-align:center; background:#bfb;"
| 98 || July 23 || Houston Astros || 4-2 || Armas (5-4) || Backe (8-7) || Cordero (34) || 42,680 || 55-43
|-  style="text-align:center; background:#fbb;"
| 99 || July 24 || Houston Astros || 1-4 (14)  || Springer (3-3) || Carrasco (3-3) || Lidge (23) || 39,203 || 55-44
|-  style="text-align:center; background:#fbb;"
| 100 || July 26 || @ Atlanta Braves || 2-3 (10) || Reitsma (3-2) || Stanton (1-3) || || 43,308 || 55-45
|-  style="text-align:center; background:#fbb;"
| 101 || July 27 || @ Atlanta Braves || 3-4 || Kolb (3-6) || Majewski (2-2) || Reitsma (11) || 40,625 || 55-46
|-  style="text-align:center; background:#fbb;"
| 102 || July 28 || @ Atlanta Braves || 4-5 || Sosa (6-1) || Drese (7-10) || Reitsma (12) || 40,269 || 55-47
|-  style="text-align:center; background:#fbb;"
| 103 || July 29 || @ Florida Marlins || 3-4 || Beckett (10-6) || Armas (5-5) || Jones (19) || 29,322 || 55-48
|-  style="text-align:center; background:#fbb;"
| 104 || July 30 || @ Florida Marlins || 0-3 || Burnett (8-6)  || Patterson (4-3) || Jones (20) || 25,308 || 55-49
|-  style="text-align:center; background:#bfb;"
| 105 || July 31 || @ Florida Marlins || 4-2 || Hernández (13-4) || Moehler (6-8) || Cordero (35) || 30,397 || 56-49
|-

|-  style="text-align:center; background:#fbb;"
| 106 || August 2 || Los Angeles Dodgers || 4-5 || Weaver (9-8) || Loaiza (6-7) || Brazobán (21) || 36,277 || 56-50
|-  style="text-align:center; background:#bfb;"
| 107 || August 3 || Los Angeles Dodgers || 3-1 || Armas (6-5) || Houlton (4-5) || Cordero (36) || 36,552 || 57-50
|-  style="text-align:center; background:#bfb;"
| 108 || August 4 || Los Angeles Dodgers || 7-0 || Patterson (5-3) || Penny (5-7) || || 35,484 || 58-50
|-  style="text-align:center; background:#fbb;"
| 109 || August 5 || San Diego Padres || 5-6 || Linebrink (5-1) || Cordero (2-3) || Hoffman (28) || 34,492 || 58-51
|-  style="text-align:center; background:#fbb;"
| 110 || August 6 || San Diego Padres || 2-3 || Astacio (3-10) || Drese (7-11) || Hoffman (29) || 38,076 || 58-52
|-  style="text-align:center; background:#fbb;"
| 111 || August 7 || San Diego Padres || 0-3 || Peavy (10-4) || Loaiza (6-8) || || 36,440 || 58-53
|-  style="text-align:center; background:#bfb;"
| 112 || August 9 || @ Houston Astros || 6-5 || Patterson (6-3) ||Astacio (2-5) || Cordero (37) || 34,255 || 59-53
|-  style="text-align:center; background:#fbb;"
| 113 || August 10 || @ Houston Astros || 6-7 || Rodríguez (7-5) || Hernández (13-5) || Lidge (28) || 34,309 || 59-54
|-  style="text-align:center; background:#fbb;"
| 114 || August 11 || @ Houston Astros || 3-6 || Pettitte (10-8) || Drese (7-12) || || 35,036 || 59-55
|-  style="text-align:center; background:#bfb;"
| 115 || August 12 || @ Colorado Rockies || 4-2 || Loaiza (7-8) || Wright (6-13) || Cordero (38) || 28,598 || 60-55
|-  style="text-align:center; background:#bfb;"
| 116 || August 13 || @ Colorado Rockies || 8-0 || Armas (7-5) || Kim (3-9) || || 31,447 || 61-55
|-  style="text-align:center; background:#bfb;"
| 117 || August 14 || @ Colorado Rockies || 9-2 || Patterson (7-3) || Acevedo (2-3) || || 24,552 || 62-55
|-  style="text-align:center; background:#bfb;"
| 118 || August 15 || @ Philadelphia Phillies || 6-3 || Hernández (14-5) || Myers (10-6) || || 40,627 || 63-55
|-  style="text-align:center; background:#bbb;"
| || August 16 || @ Philadelphia Phillies || colspan=6 |Postponed (rain) Rescheduled for August 18 as part of a double header
|-  style="text-align:center; background:#fbb;"
| 119 || August 17 || @ Philadelphia Phillies || 3-4 || Lieber (12-10) || Loaiza (7-9) || Wagner (28) || 33,450 || 63-56
|-  style="text-align:center; background:#fbb;"
| 120 || August 18 (1)  || @ Philadelphia Phillies || 1-2 || Padilla (6-11) || Armas (7-6) || Wagner (29) || 30,046 || 63-57
|-  style="text-align:center; background:#bfb;"
| 121 || August 18 (2) || @ Philadelphia Phillies || 5-4 || Ayala (8-6) || Urbina (4-4) || Cordero (39) || 34,492 || 64-57
|-  style="text-align:center; background:#fbb;"
| 122 || August 19 || @ New York Mets || 0-1 || Seo (5-1) || Patterson (7-4) || Looper (24) || 38,196 || 64-58
|-  style="text-align:center; background:#fbb;"
| 123 || August 20 || @ New York Mets || 8-9 (10) || Hernández (6-5) || Majewski (2-3) || || 51,785 || 64-59
|-  style="text-align:center; background:#bfb;"
| 124 || August 21 || @ New York Mets || 7-4 (10) || Loaiza (8-9) || Benson (9-5) || || 42,412 || 65-59
|-  style="text-align:center; background:#fbb;"
| 125 || August 23 || Cincinnati Reds || 2-6 || Hudson (5-6) || Armas (7-7) || || 35,656 || 65-60
|-  style="text-align:center; background:#bfb;"
| 126 || August 24 || Cincinnati Reds || 5-3 || Patterson (8-4) || Ortiz (8-9) || Cordero (40) || 32,641 || 66-60
|-  style="text-align:center; background:#fbb;"
| 127 || August 25 || Cincinnati Reds || 3-5 || Claussen (9-8) || Hernández (14-6) || Weathers (11) || 40,762 || 66-61
|-  style="text-align:center; background:#bfb;"
| 128 || August 26 || St. Louis Cardinals || 4-1 || Loaiza (9-9) || Suppan (12-10) || Cordero (41) || 37,885 || 67-61
|-  style="text-align:center; background:#fbb;"
| 129 || August 27 || St. Louis Cardinals || 0-6 || Marquis (10-13) || White (0-1) || || 44,254 || 67-62
|-  style="text-align:center; background:#fbb;"
| 130 || August 28 || St. Louis Cardinals || 0-6 || Thompson (2-0) || Halama (1-2) || || 41,130 || 67-63
|-  style="text-align:center; background:#bbb;"
| || August 29 || @ Atlanta Braves || colspan=6 |Postponed (rain) Rescheduled for August 31 as part of a double header
|-  style="text-align:center; background:#bfb;"
| 131 || August 30 || @ Atlanta Braves || 3-2 || Bergmann (1-0) || Sosa (9-3) || Cordero (42) || 20,001 || 68-63
|-  style="text-align:center; background:#fbb;"
| 132 || August 31 (1) || @ Atlanta Braves || 3-5 || Ramírez (11-8) || Loaiza (9-10) || Farnsworth (8) || rowspan=2| 25,555|| 68-64
|-  style="text-align:center; background:#bfb;"
| 133 || August 31 (2) || @ Atlanta Braves || 4-3 || Stanton (2-3) || Reitsma (3-5) || Cordero (43) || 69-64
|-

|-  style="text-align:center; background:#fbb;"
| 134 || September 1 || @ Atlanta Braves || 7-8 (10) || Davies (7-3) || Ayala (8-7) || || 19,053 || 69-65
|-  style="text-align:center; background:#fbb;"
| 135 || September 2 || Philadelphia Phillies || 1-7 || Padilla (8-12) || Halama (1-3) || || 28,939 || 69-66
|-  style="text-align:center; background:#bfb;"
| 136 || September 3 || Philadelphia Phillies || 5-4 (12) || Carrasco (4-3) || López (0-1) || || 30,561 || 70-66
|-  style="text-align:center; background:#bfb;"
| 137 || September 4 || Philadelphia Phillies || 6-1 || Loaiza (10-10) || Floyd (1-2) || || 32,251 || 71-66
|-  style="text-align:center; background:#bfb;"
| 138 || September 5 || Florida Marlins || 5-2 || Hernández (15-6) || Vargas (5-3) || || 32,150 || 72-66
|-  style="text-align:center; background:#fbb;"
| 139 || September 6 || Florida Marlins || 2-4 || Valdez (2-1) || Rasner (0-1) || Jones (35) || 24.936 || 72-67
|-  style="text-align:center; background:#fbb;"
| 140 || September 7 || Florida Marlins || 1-12 || Willis (20-8) || Halama (1-4) || || 25,702 || 72-68
|-  style="text-align:center; background:#fbb;"
| 141 || September 8 || Florida Marlins || 4-8 || Beckett (13-8) || Patterson (8-5) || || 27,625 || 72-69
|-  style="text-align:center; background:#bfb;"
| 142 || September 9 || Atlanta Braves || 8-6 || Majewski (3-3) || Foster (4-2) || Cordero (44) || 36,295 || 73-69
|-  style="text-align:center; background:#fbb;"
| 143 || September 10 || Atlanta Braves || 0-4 || Sosa (11-3) || Hernández (15-7) || || 44,083 || 73-70
|-  style="text-align:center; background:#fbb;"
| 144 || September 11 || Atlanta Braves || 7-9 || McBride (1-0) || Cordero (2-4) || Farnsworth (12) || 31,384 || 73-71
|-  style="text-align:center; background:#bfb;"
| 145 || September 13 || @ New York Mets || 4-2 || Majewski (4-3) || Glavine (10-13) || Cordero (45) || 34,143 || 74-71
|-  style="text-align:center; background:#bfb;"
| 146 || September 14 || @ New York Mets || 6-3 || Loaiza (11-10) || Benson (9-8) || Cordero (46) || 24,049 || 75-71
|-  style="text-align:center; background:#bfb;"
| 147 || September 15 || @ New York Mets || 6-5 (10) || Bergmann (2-0) || Hernández (6-6) || Majewski (1) || 21,441 || 76-71
|-  style="text-align:center; background:#bfb;"
| 148 || September 16 || @ San Diego Padres || 5-1 || Patterson (9-5) || Peavy (12-7) || || 38,480 || 77-71
|-  style="text-align:center; background:#fbb;"
| 149 || September 17 || @ San Diego Padres || 5-8 (12) || Linebrink (7-1) || Rauch (1-4) || || 37,707 || 77-72
|-  style="text-align:center; background:#fbb;"
| 150 || September 18 || @ San Diego Padres || 1-2 || Otsuka (2-6) || Eischen (2-1) || || 38,054 || 77-73
|-  style="text-align:center; background:#fbb;"
| 151 || September 20 || San Francisco Giants || 3-4 || Taschner (2-0) || Hernández (15-8) || Benítez (17) || 32,403 || 77-74
|-  style="text-align:center; background:#fbb;"
| 152 || September 21 || San Francisco Giants || 1-5 || Hennessey (5-8) || Patterson (9-6) || Benítez (18) || 32,076 || 77-75
|-  style="text-align:center; background:#bfb;"
| 153 || September 22 || San Francisco Giants || 2-0 || Rauch (2-4) || Tomko (7-15) || Cordero (47) || 29,807 || 78-75
|-  style="text-align:center; background:#fbb;"
| 154 || September 23 || New York Mets || 2-5 (10) || Hernández (8-6) || Majewski (4-4) || Heilman (2) || 30,194 || 78-76
|-  style="text-align:center; background:#fbb;"
| 155 || September 24 || New York Mets || 2-5 || Glavine (12-13) || Hernández (15-9) || Hernández (2) || 32,467 || 78-77
|-  style="text-align:center; background:#fbb;"
| 156 || September 25 || New York Mets || 5-6 || Padilla (2-1) || Hughes (1-1) || Heilman (3) || 29,967 || 78-78
|-  style="text-align:center; background:#bfb;"
| 157 || September 26 || @ Florida Marlins || 4-0 || Carrasco (5-3) || Vargas (5-5) || || 11,467 || 79-78
|-  style="text-align:center; background:#bfb;"
| 158 || September 27 || @ Florida Marlins || 11-1 || Stanton (3-3) || Willis (22-10) || || 11,507 || 80-78
|-  style="text-align:center; background:#bfb;"
| 159 || September 28 || @ Florida Marlins || 11-7 || Loaiza (12-10) || Moehler (6-12) || || 11,961 || 81-78
|-  style="text-align:center; background:#fbb;"
| 160 || September 30 || Philadelphia Phillies || 3-4 || Lidle (13-11) || Hernández (15-10) || Wagner (37) || 30,375 || 81-79
|-

|-  style="text-align:center; background:#fbb;"
| 161 || October 1 || Philadelphia Phillies || 4-8 || Myers (13-8) || Patterson (9-7) || || 32,903 || 81-80
|-  style="text-align:center; background:#fbb;"
| 162 || October 2 || Philadelphia Phillies || 3-9 || Lieber (17-13) || Carrasco (5-4) || Wagner (38) || 36,491 || 81-81
|-

Player stats

Batting
Note: Pos = Position; G = Games played; AB = At bats; R = Runs scored; H = Hits; 2B = Doubles; 3B = Triples; HR = Home runs; RBI = Runs batted in; AVG = Batting average; SB = Stolen bases

Complete offensive statistics are available here.

Pitching
Note: Pos = Position; W = Wins; L = Losses; ERA = Earned run average; G = Games pitched; GS = Games started; SV = Saves; IP = Innings pitched; R = Runs allowed; ER = Earned runs allowed; BB = Walks allowed; K = Strikeouts

Complete pitching statistics are available here.

Team leaders

Batting

Pitching

Awards and honors

Nationals among league leaders

Batting

Pitching

All-Stars
 Liván Hernández, SP

Annual awards
 National League Rolaids Relief Man Award: Chad Cordero

Farm system

Notes

References

2005 Washington Nationals at Baseball Reference
2005 Washington Nationals season at Baseball Almanac

Washington Nationals seasons
Washington Nationals season
Nat